Isanti can refer to:

 Santee people, a subgroup of the Dakota people, a plains tribe

Places
 Isanti, Minnesota, United States, a small city
 Isanti County, Minnesota
 Isanti Township, Isanti County, Minnesota

Other
 Word for knife in the Dakota language